L'Islet may refer to:
 L'Islet, Quebec, a municipality
 L'Islet Regional County Municipality, an administrative unit in Quebec
 L'Islet (electoral district), a former federal electoral district in Quebec
 L'Islet (provincial electoral district), a former provincial electoral district in Quebec